Pankaj Rag is an Indian poet and IAS officer of 1990 batch. He has served as the  Commissioner of Directorate of archeology,  archives and museums, in Bhopal, Madhya Pradesh, Director-General of National Archives of India, and Director of Film and Television Institute of India, Pune, Maharashtra.

Rag was born on 30 October 1964 in Muzaffarpur, Bihar. He graduated in History from St. Stephen's College, Delhi, and completed his Master of Philosophy in modern Indian history from Delhi University. Rag is a recipient of Kedar Samman and Mira Smriti award.

Bibliography

Vintage Madhya Pradesh
Rag Ragini Folio (Hindi & English) along with V.P. Nagayach

See also
 List of Indian writers

References

External links
Profile of Pankaj Rag at National Archives of India

1964 births
20th-century Indian archaeologists
20th-century Indian male writers
20th-century Indian poets
Hindi-language poets
Hindi-language writers
Indian civil servants
Indian male poets
Living people
People from Muzaffarpur
Poets from Bihar
Scientists from Bihar